Butte Regional Transit (d/b/a B-Line) is a public transit system which provides bus service in the communities of Biggs, Chico, Gridley, Magalia, Oroville, Palermo, Paradise and across Butte County, California. B-Line is the consolidation of CATS in Chico, OATS in Oroville and BCT in Butte County.

Facilities

Butte Regional Transit Office
326 Huss Drive, Chico.

Chico Transit Center
2nd Street at Salem.

Oroville Transit Center
Spencer Avenue at Oro Dam Boulevard East.

Paradise Transit Center
Almond Street at Cedar Street.

Routes

References

Transportation in Butte County, California
Bus transportation in California
Transit agencies in California
Chico, California
Gridley, California
Oroville, California